was a Japanese professional Go player of Hoensha and Nihon Ki-in who reached 5-dan in 1902. Hirose was the teacher of Iwamoto Kaoru and Kato Shin. Other disciples of Hirose included Tsuyamori Itsuro, Iida Haruji and Sakaguchi Tsunejiro.

Biography 
In 1895 he achieved 3 dan.
In 1898 he achieved 4 dan.
In 1901 he started to play Jubango with Ishii Senji.
In 1902 he achieved 5 dan.
In 1907 he started to play Jubango with Izawa Genkichi.
In 1912 he achieved 6 dan.
In 1918 he traveled to China because of an invitation from the prime minister of the Republic of China.
In 1920 he became the fifth president of Hoensha.
In 1921 he achieved 7 dan.
In 1924 he retired because of illness.

External links
Sensei's Library profile

1865 births
1940 deaths
Japanese Go players